Robert G. Allbee (born December 14, 1928) is a former justice of the Iowa Supreme Court from July 18, 1978, to June 30, 1982, appointed from Polk County, Iowa.

References

Justices of the Iowa Supreme Court
Living people
1928 births
Place of birth missing (living people)
Drake University Law School alumni
Colorado College alumni